For the sport called "beach paddleball", see Matkot. For other sports called "paddleball", see Paddleball (sport).

Beach tennis is a game combining elements of tennis and volleyball and played on a beach.

Overview
Beach tennis is played in over 50 countries and by more than half a million people, with its greatest popularity occurring in Italy, Brazil and Spain. Beach tennis offers a highly aerobic cardio workout with low impact to the knees and joints because it is played on sand.

The sport preserves most of the rules and scoring of traditional tennis, though modifications have been made to adapt to movement around the sand court and to the faster pace of the game. As the ball may not touch the ground, the game is played entirely with volleys, which makes for a quicker game than does traditional tennis. Points start with a serve and end when the ball touches the ground, forcing players to dive to reach difficult plays in a similar manner used by volleyball players. The objective is to return the ball with only one hit so that it reaches the opposing side of the net.

A depressurized tennis ball, which travels more slowly through the air than does a regulation tennis ball, is used for beach tennis to allow for longer rallies. The sport is usually played by two-person teams on a regulation beach-volleyball court with a 5-foot-7-inch-high net.

History
Beach tennis emerged in Italy in the early 1970s when tennis players on vacation in Lido degli Estensi, in the Ferrara town of Comacchio, played using their rackets and the existing volleyball nets already installed on the beach. The game was played for the first time with its current set of rules in Torredembarra, Spain in 1976. The first championship was played in Torredembarra in 1978. Since then (with few interruptions), it takes place on the same beach every year. Over the years, the sport spread to the beaches along the coast of Italy, and it is estimated that there are now more than 1,600 beach-tennis nets along the Italian coast in addition to a growing number of inland and indoor courts. There are an estimated 250,000 Italian beach tennis players.

The international spread 
Beach tennis arrived on the beaches of Rio de Janeiro around 2008, and the sport now dominates about one-third of the beach-volleyball courts along the Brazilian coast, and there are more than 50,000 beach tennis players in Brazil. Most Brazilian tennis clubs have converted, or are converting, at least one traditional tennis court into a few beach-tennis courts.

Though originally played only on beaches, beach tennis is now played at tennis clubs, indoor beach tennis/volleyball warehouses, country clubs, resorts, gyms and sand arenas.

Some believe that the sport is entering its golden age following its recognition by the International Tennis Federation (ITF) in 2010. The ITF now manages the most well-known and reputable international ranking of beach-tennis players. The ITF is allocating resources to the development of the sport and has set up exposition sand courts at professional tennis tournaments such as the Japan Open, Roland-Garros, the Australian Open and the US Open.
 
Top tennis players who have played beach tennis include Maria Sharapova, Serena Williams, Victoria Azarenka, Andy Murray, the Bryan brothers, Rafael Nadal and Gustavo Kuerten.

The ITF also supports beach tennis by sanctioning tournaments. In 2013, the ITF began to organize regional and world championships. By 2015, 89 official sanctioned tournaments were held worldwide annually, and thousands more unofficial tournaments are held around the world each year. In 2015 the Pan-American games were held in Santos, São Paulo, Brazil, with participants from 16 countries. Also in 2015, a team championship tournament was held in Moscow with participants from 28 countries, with adult, junior, male and female teams

In the United States
Beach tennis was formalized in the United States in 2005 by Marc Altheim, who discovered the sport on a trip to Aruba in 2003. The sport had been played there since 2000, having been introduced by a Dutchman. As of 2007, beach tennis had made progress toward acceptance as a mainstream sport, with an official standards organization known as Beach Tennis USA (BT USA). In 2007, BT USA reached television deals with the Tennis Channel and SNY, but the organization is no longer active. The Beach Tennis Association currently maintains player rankings and operates tournaments in Southern California.

ITF Beach Tennis World Championship

Men's

Women's

ITF Beach Tennis World Team Championship

Notes

References

External links
 IFBT-International federation of beach tennis or beach paddle tennis (Mostly in Italian)
 IFBT International Beach Tennis (Current governing body)
 ITF / A guide to beach tennis
 ITF Beach Tennis Tour
 ITF Current Rankings

Forms of tennis
Racket sports
tennis
Sports originating in Italy